Alan Quinlivan (1915-1965) was an Australian rugby league footballer who played in the 1930s and 1940s. He was one of five rugby league playing brothers; Clinton, Jack, Leon and Oscar Quinlivan.

Playing career
Quinlivan played for the South Sydney club for seven seasons between 1936 and 1940, 1942 and 1945. He then played two seasons with Eastern Suburbs between 1946 and 1947. 

He represented New South Wales on three occasions during 1940.

Death
Quinlivan died at Newcastle, New South Wales on 17 November 1965, aged 50. He is buried at Sandgate Cemetery.

References

1915 births
1965 deaths
Australian rugby league players
New South Wales rugby league team players
Place of birth missing
Rugby league centres
Rugby league five-eighths
South Sydney Rabbitohs players
Sydney Roosters players